Čelko, Celko or Chelko is a surname of Slovak origin. The surname is rare, there are a few hundreds people with this name in the world. Today the Čelko surname is still primarily found in Slovakia but a few branches of the family line can also be found in areas of United States (Brackenridge, PA and West Natrona, PA) and Argentina.

Francis L. Chelko personally visited Celkova-Lehota 3 times since 1988 and verified through village documentation the origin and citizenship of grandfather and great-grandfather Chelko (Celko original Slovak spelling).

Origin
The name originates from small village Čelkova Lehota (it means "Čelko's settlement") in Považská Bystrica District in Trenčín Region of north-western Slovakia. 
The village has about 140 - 150 inhabitants, mostly with the Čelko surname.

People with the surname

Joe Celko, American relational database expert
Vojtech Čelko (born 1946), Slovak and Czech historian

Slovak-language surnames